Emirates Aviation University (EAU), also known as Emirates Aviation College, is a university located in Dubai, United Arab Emirates.  It is the educational arm of The Emirates Group. The EAU offers education in aeronautical engineering, aviation management, business management, aviation safety and security studies.

History 
In 1991, Dubai Aviation College was established by the Dubai Civil Aviation Authority to provide aviation related training to private students. In September 2001, the Dubai Aviation College joined with Emirates Training College and was renamed to the Emirates Aviation College. In December 2010, Emirates Aviation College was given the university status by the UAE Ministry of Higher Education and Scientific Research, hence it was renamed Emirates Aviation University.

See also
Emirates Flight Training Academy

References

2010 establishments in the United Arab Emirates
Aviation in the United Arab Emirates
Educational institutions established in 1991
The Emirates Group
Universities and colleges in Dubai